Sabail FK is an Azerbaijani football club based in Baku. The club participates in the Azerbaijan Premier League.

History
The club was established in 2016 and immediately joined the Azerbaijan First Division.
After finishing their first season in the Azerbaijan Premier League in 7th position, Samir Aliyev left the role as manager by mutual consent on 22 May 2018. Aftandil Hacıyev was appointed as the club's new manager on 11 June 2018.

Domestic history

European history
As of 17 July 2019

Notes
 QR: Qualifying round

Stadium 

Sabail's home ground is the Bayil Stadium, which has a capacity of 3,200.

Players

Current squad

For recent transfers, see Transfers winter 2022–23.

Reserve team
Sabail-2 plays in the Azerbaijan First Division from 2018.

Coaching staff

Managerial statistics
Information correct as of match played 4 March 2023. Only competitive matches are counted.

Notes:

References

External links 
 PFL
 Official Website
 Facebook

 
Football clubs in Azerbaijan
2016 establishments in Azerbaijan
Association football clubs established in 2016